The  Cedar Rapids Titans season was the team's sixth season as a professional indoor football franchise and sixth in the Indoor Football League (IFL). One of ten teams that compete in the IFL for the 2017 season, the Titans were members of the United Conference.

Led by head coach Marvin McNutt, the Titans played their home games at the U.S. Cellular Center in downtown Cedar Rapids, Iowa.

Staff

Schedule
Key:

Pre-season

Regular season

All start times are local time

Standings

Roster

References

External links
 Cedar Rapids Titans official statistics

Cedar Rapids River Kings
Cedar Rapids Titans
Cedar Rapids Titans